Seven 2 One ( is a 2009 Hong Kong crime drama film directed by Danny Pang.

Plot
Convenience store clerks Chrissie (Chrissie Chau) and Katy (Katy Kung) decide to get back at their sleazy manager Leo (Leo Chim) by having their friends pose as robbers and hold up the store, but events escalate out of control into murder. What started as an elaborate prank sets off a butterfly effect of crime, consequence, and desperation as more and more people get pulled into the mess.

Cast
 Elanne Kong as Ling
 Pakho Chow as Pak-ho
 William Chan as William
 Stephanie Cheng
 Siu Fay 
 James Ho 
 Gary Chiu as Gary
 Chrissie Chau as Chrissie
 Izz Tsu 
 Wylie Chiu as Wylie
 Jeremy Tsui as Cheng-hei
 Katy Kung as Katy
 Chan Chor-kiu as Carolyn
 Yung Cheng as Yung
 Leo Chim as Leo
 Terence Chui as Gut
 Ho Seung-him as Orange 
 Mimi Chi Yan Kung

External links

Seven 2 One at the Hong Kong Movie Database
Seven 2 One at the Hong Kong Cinemagic

Hong Kong crime thriller films
2009 crime drama films
2009 crime thriller films
2000s Cantonese-language films
2009 films
2000s Hong Kong films